Šilalė (Samogitian: Šėlalė) is a town in Western Lithuania, Samogitia, Tauragė County. The River Lokysta flows through the town and there is a pond in the centre of the town.

History
The town is part of the Samogitian ethnographic region of Lithuania and was first mentioned in the sixteenth century. Its name derives from the generic word sila ("Pinewood") and Samogitian suffix -alė.

In July 1941, 135 Jewish men from Šilalė were shot on a site in the Jewish cemetery.
In September 1941, the Jewish women and children of Šilalė were shot in the Tūbinės forest. Around 1,300 Jews were massacred by an Einsatzgruppen of Germans and local Lithuanian collaborators.

Population

Ethnic composition 
2011 – population of 5,492 people: 
 Lithuanian – 99.02% (5438);
 Russian – 0.33% (18);
 Other – 0.66% (36).
2001 – population of 6,281 people: 
 Lithuanian – 99.23% (6235);
 Russian – 0.37% (23);
 Other – 0.37% (23).

Notable people 
 Ferdinand Ignatius Piłsudski (–), Lithuanian nobleman, and a Colonel and Commander in the Samogitian division of the Grand Duchy of Lithuania.
Franciszek Piłsudski (1713–1791) Lithuanian nobleman, Podczaszy (Deputy Cup Bearer) and member of the Sejm in the Polish–Lithuanian Commonwealth.
Stasys Girėnas (1893–1933), Lithuanian–American pilot
 Lukas Lekavičius,  professional basketball player

References

 
Cities in Lithuania
Cities in Tauragė County
Municipalities administrative centres of Lithuania
Rossiyensky Uyezd
Holocaust locations in Lithuania
Šilalė District Municipality